William Schwer (born 12 April 1969 in Luton, England), known as Billy Schwer, is a former professional boxer.

For the majority of his professional career, Schwer fought in the lightweight division but also competed in the  light welterweight division. He is a former British, Commonwealth and European lightweight and the IBO World Light Welter-weight title Champion.

Background
Schwer's father was the Irish amateur title holder in the 1960s before he emigrated to England.

Amateur career
Schwer attended Challney High School for Boys (Luton). A former national schoolboy title holder, he represented England at the youth and senior levels. At the 1990 ABA National Championships held at the Royal Albert Hall, London, Schwer represent the Luton Irish Boxing Club and was runner up to Patrick 'Blueboy' Gallagher, in the lightweight division.

Professional career
Schwer was trained by Jack Lindsay and fought out of Luton. He was a popular fighter and attracted a large local following. He had his first professional fight in October 1990. His first fight took place at the York Hall, Bethnal Green, London, where he beat Frenchman Pierre Conan with a first round knockout.

Title fights

British and Commonwealth Feather weight title 
Schwer's first title fight came in 1992 against Carl Crook.

See also
 List of British lightweight boxing champions

References

External links
 
 Profile
 Biodata 
 Official website

1969 births
English male boxers
Living people
Sportspeople from Luton
English people of Irish descent
Light-welterweight boxers